Miron Borisovich Polyakin ((February 12, 1895 in Cherkasy - May 21, 1941 in Moscow) was a Russian Empire and Soviet violinist and pedagogue, one of the best known disciples of the famous Leopold Auer.  Between 1917-1926 he toured many countries of the world, and in 1922 gave his New York debut.  Upon his return to the Soviet Union, he undertook the professorship position at the Leningrad Conservatory (1928–1936) and then the Moscow Conservatory (1936–1941).

External links
 Biography – in Russian

1895 births
1941 deaths

Classical violinists from the Russian Empire
Male classical violinists
Musicians from Cherkasy
Soviet classical violinists